The name Mulligan Stew or similar terms may represent the following:

Mulligan stew (food), a hobo dinner dish
Mulligan Stew (novel), a novel by Gilbert Sorrentino
Mulligan Stew (TV series), a children's educational television series produced in 1972
Mulligan's Stew, a 1977 NBC sitcom starring Lawrence Pressman and Elinor Donahue